Euphorbia abramsiana, commonly known as Abram's spurge or Abram's sandmat, is a species of plant in the family Euphorbiaceae native to California.

References 

abramsiana